The Fondaco dei Turchi (Venetian: Fontego dei Turchi) is a Veneto-Gothic style palazzo, later on named as the Turks' Inn, on the Grand Canal of Venice, northeast Italy.  

It was described by Augustus Hare in the 19th century as "a Byzantine palace of the 9th century, and one of the earliest buildings, not ecclesiastical, in Venice. .... A few years ago it was one of the most unique and curious buildings in Europe, and the most important specimen of Italo-Byzantine architecture, but it was modernised and almost rebuilt by the ... government in 1869".

Early history

The palace was constructed in the first half of the 13th century by Giacomo Palmier, an exile from Pesaro. The Venetian Republic purchased it in 1381 for Niccolò II d'Este, the Marquess of Ferrara. During its early history, the palazzo also served as a residence to many visiting dignitaries.

Turkish quarters
From the early 17th century through to 1838, the fondaco served as a residence for Venice's Ottoman Turkish population (thus "dei Turchi"). The fondaco (from Arab: fonduk) then served as a combination home, warehouse, and market for the Turkish traders, as the Fondaco dei Tedeschi served as headquarters and restricted living quarters for German foreigners. 

A number of restrictions were placed on the fondaco and its residents, including certain times one was able to enter and leave the fondaco, as well as on trading. Among other things, Venetian Turks imported wax, crude oil, and wool to the city.  After the Venetian Republic was conquered and abolished by Napoleon Bonaparte in 1797, the Turkish traders continued to live in the palazzo until 1838.  The building was in a very bad state by the mid-19th century, and was completely restored between 1860 and 1880. Some innovations have been added to the original Veneto-Byzantine design: for example, there were originally no towers on either side.

Today
From 1890 to 1923, the area was home to the Museo Correr collection, which was moved to the Procuratie Nuove and Ala Napoleonica museums, at the Piazza San Marco, after 1923. Today, the area houses the Natural History Museum of Venice, with historical collections of flora and fauna, fossils, and an aquarium.

See also
Venetian Ghetto
Fondaco dei Tedeschi

Notes

References

Houses completed in the 13th century
Dei Turchi
Dei Turchi
Museums in Venice
Ottoman Empire–Republic of Venice relations
Republic of Venice
Geography of Venice